Seven Stars were an association football (soccer) club from Cape Town, Western Cape, South Africa.

History
They were formed in 1995 by Rob Moore. Seven Stars was also known for its commitment to develop talent in under developed the Langa, Khayelitsha and Nyanga and used the under-developed Nyanga Stadium as a home venue. In the 1997–98 National First Division season, Seven Stars were unbeaten in the 38 games under Gavin Hunt, finished as runners-up to coastal champs Engen Santos. The team scored 96 goals and conceded 16 and went through an unbeaten run of 80 games. Stars merged with Cape Town Spurs and became Ajax Cape Town in 1999. However, none of the club's identity, ethos, or commitment to township football was retained after the Ajax merger. It is widely regarded that the ethos of Seven Stars and a winning mentality in Cape Town football were restored by the launch of Cape Town City FC in 2016.

Notable former managers
 Gavin Hunt (1995–1998)

References

Defunct soccer clubs in South Africa
Association football clubs established in 1995
Association football clubs disestablished in 1999
Soccer clubs in Cape Town
1995 establishments in South Africa
1999 disestablishments in South Africa